Amanda Manopo (born Amanda Gabriella Manopo Lugue; 6 December 1999) is an Indonesian actress, model, singer, and entrepreneur, born in Jakarta.

Filmography

Film

Web series

TV series

FTV (Film Television) 
 Anakku Tulang Punggung Keluarga
 Aku Ingin Berbuat Baik
 Berkah Anak Pancingan
 Ayah Jangan Ajarkan Aku Mencuri
 Aku Gamau Suami Seperti Ayahku (2015) as Nisa
 Hidupku Bagaikan Boneka (2015) as Icha
 Hanya Kamu Yang Bisa Selamatkan Anakku (2015) as Salma and Salwa
 Saat Dipertemukan, Saat Itu Kehilangan (2015) as Ananda
 Derita Membawah Berkah (2016) as Najwa
 Ikhlas Hati Untuk Ayah
 Kambing Cantik Jatuh Cinta (2016) as Echa
 Telor Asin Cap Cinta (2016)
 Cinta Mujur Tukang Bajigur (2016)
 Lope Mermaid In Love (2016) as Ariel
 Mama Minta Menantu (2017) as Kinar
 Baby Sitter Metal Pujaanku (2017) as Giska
 Terciduk Cinta Kids Jaman Now (2017) as Raisa
 Queen Of Jengkol (2017) as Rosa
 Pemuja Mantan (2017) as Andin
 Murni Ai Lop You Pull (2018) as Murni
 Pembalasan Suster Ngepot (2018) as Siska
 Cinta Kwek-Kwek Gadis Bebek (2018) as Ratna
 Dari Udang Jadi Sayang (2018) as Arin
 Pempek Palembang Rasa Sayang (2018) as Rara
 Orang Kaya Baru Jadi Calon Bini (2019) as Cinta
 Tersanjung For Evah, Dinikahi Boss Handsome (2020) as Nassya
 Suara Hati Istri: Sakitnya Hatiku Tak Pernah Mendapat Cinta Suami (2020) as Arum
 Suara Hati Istri: Apakah Seorang Istri Harus Terima Selalu Disakiti (2020) as Wenny
 Suara Hati Istri: Suami Sempurna Di Sosmed, Suami Buruk Di Dunia Nyata (2020) as Like
 Suara Hati Istri: Aku Istri Yang Tak Pernah Dibela Suami (2020) as Risa
 Suara Hati Istri: Game Online Adalah Istri Kedua Suamiku (2020) as Qory
 Suara Hati Istri: Aku Istri Yang Terpenjara Perkawinan Siriku (2020) as Santi
 Suara Hati Istri: Istri Bayaran (2020) as Lisna

TV Program 
 Brownis - Trans TV
 Rumpi (No Secret) - Trans TV
 Santuy Malam - Trans TV
 The Sultan - SCTV as guest
 Mabar Yuk! - NET.

Discography

Single

Music video 

 "Ku Tak Sempurna" — Pasto (2017)

Awards and nominations

Reference

External links 

 
 
 
 Amanda Manopo di TikTok

Living people
1999 births
Indonesian actresses
Indonesian female models
Indonesian women singers